John Banda (born 20 August 1993) is Malawian footballer who plays for UD Songo as a midfielder.

He played for Malawi at the 2021 Africa Cup of Nations.

International career

International goals
Scores and results list Malawi's goal tally first.

References 

1992 births
Living people
Association football midfielders
Malawian footballers
Malawi international footballers
Blue Eagles FC players
Clube Ferroviário de Nampula players
UD Songo players
Malawian expatriate footballers
Expatriate footballers in Mozambique
Malawian expatriate sportspeople in Mozambique
2021 Africa Cup of Nations players